The following tables show the hits scored on individual ships at the Battle of Jutland. They provide good insights into when conditions favoured each of the navies and an image of the standard of gunnery in both forces.

Hits on capital ships, 15:48-16:54

Hits on Capital Ships, 16:54-18:15

Hits on capital ships, 18:15-19:00

Hits on capital ships, 19:00-19:45

Hits on capital ships and pre-dreadnoughts, 19:45-20:39
There were no hits on British ships in this time interval.

Accuracy
Hits obtained by British Battlecruisers and Battleships
(BCS = Battlecruiser squadron)
(BS = Battle Squadron)

Hits obtained by German Battlecruisers and Battleships

Reference list

 

Battle of Jutland
Jut